Craig Walt Emmanuel (born 5 May 1986 in St Lucia) is a West Indian cricketer who plays first class cricket for Windward Islands. He made his debut in the 2003–04 season by playing three games for West Indies U-19. At the conclusion of the 2005–06 season, he has played 19 first class and 15 List A games, all for the Windward Islands apart from the three one-day games for the U-19 side. Emmanuel has played as a specialist batsman, and his highest score in senior top-level cricket is 73.

External links
 Craig Emmanuel at CricketArchive

1986 births
Living people
Saint Lucian cricketers
Windward Islands cricketers
Combined Campuses and Colleges cricketers
Saint Lucia representative cricketers